The Cathedral of St Joseph (or simply ) is the Roman Catholic cathedral of the Archdiocese of Chongqing, situated on St Joseph Lane, Minsheng Road in Yuzhong District of the city of Chongqing, West China.

History 

The cathedral was built in the late 19th century by French missionaries of the Paris Foreign Missions Society. The construction started in 1879 and was completed in 1891, a bell tower was added to the building in 1893. It has a square tower with a clock and is covered in ivy.

See also
 Catholic Church in Sichuan
 Cathedral of the Angels, Xichang
 Cathedral of the Immaculate Conception, Chengdu

References

External links
 Cathedral of St. Joseph on GCatholic.com
 ChongQing St Joseph Catholic Church China Part 1 on YouTube

Roman Catholic churches in Chongqing
Chongqing
St Joseph, Chongqing
Roman Catholic churches completed in 1891
Roman Catholic churches completed in 1893
19th-century Roman Catholic church buildings in China
Yuzhong District